Kevin Craft (born October 15, 1985) is a former American football quarterback and Head Coach for the IBM Big Blue in the Japanese X-League. 
He played college football at UCLA.

High school years
Craft attended Valley Center High School in Valley Center, California and was an excellent student and a letterman in football, basketball, and track. In football, he was a three-year letterman and earned All-California Interscholatic Federation honors. Kevin Craft graduated from Valley Center High School in 2004.

College career

SDSU
Craft originally attended San Diego State University, where his father, former SDSU Aztecs quarterback Tom Craft, was head coach.  Arriving in 2005, Craft redshirted his first year; his father was fired at the end of the season and replaced by Chuck Long.  Craft remained and, as a redshirt freshman, appeared in nine games and started five as the Aztecs went on to a 3–9 record in 2006; he had a 109.8 passer rating. In his first career start at San Diego State, Kevin Craft completed 20 of 32 passes for 216 yards against BYU.

Mt. SAC
Craft transferred from SDSU after the season and played football at Mt. San Antonio College (Mt. SAC) in Walnut, California during the 2007 season; again for his father Tom, who became the offensive coordinator at Mt. SAC.

UCLA
Craft transferred to UCLA in time for the 2008 spring practices.  He soon found himself in as the starting quarterback for the UCLA Bruins Football team after the two veteran starters, Ben Olson and Patrick Cowan, both fell to extended injuries.  In the Bruins opener for the 2008 season, Craft led the Bruins to a 27–24 victory against 18th ranked Tennessee in overtime. After throwing 4 interceptions in the first half he came back to complete 18 of 25 passes for 193 yards and 1 touchdown in the second half.

The Bruins finished the season with a record of 4–8 (3–6 Pac-10) and failed to participate in a post-season bowl game. He competed with Kevin Prince and freshman Richard Brehaut for the quarterback position in 2009.

In the 2009 Washington game at the Rose Bowl, Craft came in after Kevin Prince went out to guide the Bruins to a one-point victory, 24–23, and an end to the team's five straight Pac-10 conference losses. He had 10 of 14 completions for 159 yards with an interception.

Professional career

Cougars de Saint-Ouen-l'Aumône

France 2010-2011
In 2010, Kevin signed with the Cougars de Saint-Ouen l'Aumône, France. The Cougars play in the highest level of competition in France Ligue Élite de Football Américain and in the EFAF Cup.
Every team in the French national championship is eligible to sign two American players. Kevin decided to choose this challenge over his coaching job in order to try to help the Cougars to reach the national title. Craft chose the Cougars despite a late offer from the CFL Calgary Stampeders.

During the 2010 season, Kevin completed 216 of 398 passes for 2,851 yards, 28 touchdowns and 13 interceptions. He rushed for 245 yards and scored 4 touchdowns. The Cougars reached the playoff in both seasons without reaching the championship game.

IBM Big Blue

2012
In 2012, Kevin played for IBM Big Blue in Japanese X-league. He was an all league selection and a rookie of the year for the central division.

2013

2014
Craft passed for 199 yards in a May 31, 2014 game.

2015

Statistics

Regular season

Post season

Personal
Craft majored in sociology and participated in the 2009 UCLA commencement ceremony.

See also
2008 UCLA Bruins football team
2009 UCLA Bruins football team

References

American football quarterbacks
American expatriate players of American football
Players of American football from California
1985 births
Living people
American expatriate sportspeople in Japan
Mt. SAC Mounties football players
UCLA Bruins football players
San Diego State Aztecs football players
Sportspeople from Escondido, California
People from Valley Center, California
American expatriate sportspeople in France